The Fallow Buck Inn is a public house in Clay Hill, Enfield, and a grade II listed building with Historic England.

References

External links

Enfield, London
Pubs in the London Borough of Enfield
Grade II listed pubs in London